Acharnaikos Football Club is a Greek football club based in Acharnes (Menidi area), Attica, Greece. It was created in 1938 and was founded in 1953. The club was known as Yperochi Menidi until 1961. It plays in Acharnes Stadium, which has a 4,450 seating capacity. The club´s logo is a cloverleaf with two alphas in the left and top and an omicron at the right. 

Acharnaikos competes in the Football League, the second division of the Greek football league system. However, in November 2017 it was expelled from the league for the 2017–2018 season for failure to pay players. 40 players were subsequently released.

Achievements

 Athens FCA: (1, not fully listed)
1970

Positions
Until the 1990s, Acharnaikos participated with Athens FCA

 Athens FCA 1969-70: 1st (Group B: 1st)
 Athens FCA 1976-77: 2nd (Group A: 1st)

League and cup history

Yperochi Menidi (before 1961)

Acharnaikos (since 1961)

References

External links
 News, results, full coverage 
 Acharnes Field 

Football clubs in Attica
Association football clubs established in 1953
1953 establishments in Greece
Acharnes